Montréal–Notre-Dame-de-Grâce was a former provincial electoral district in the Montreal region of Quebec, Canada that elected members to the Legislative Assembly of Quebec.

It was created for the 1939 election from part of Westmount electoral district.  Its final general election was in 1962 (there was a 1963 by-election).  It disappeared in the 1966 election and its successor electoral district was Notre-Dame-de-Grâce.

Members of the Legislative Assembly
 James Arthur Mathewson, Liberal (1939–1948)
 Paul Earl, Liberal (1948–1963)
 Eric Kierans, Liberal (1963–1966)

Election results

|-
 
|Liberal
|Eric Kierans
|align="right"|21,878
|align="right"|85.62
|align="right"|+7.07
|-

|Independent
|John Boyle
|align="right"|2,342
|align="right"|9.16
|align="right"|-
|-
 
|Independent Lib.
|Luke Gerald Dougherty
|align="right"|1,108	
|align="right"|4.34
|align="right"|-0.72
|-
 
|Independent Lib.
|Henri Paquet
|align="right"|225	
|align="right"|0.88
|align="right"|-
|-
|}

|-
 
|Liberal
|Paul Earl
|align="right"|37,100
|align="right"|78.55
|align="right"|+12.37
|-

|-
 
|Independent Lib.
|Luke Gerald Dougherty
|align="right"|2,389
|align="right"|5.06
|align="right"|-
|-
|}

|-
 
|Liberal
|Paul Earl
|align="right"|29,857
|align="right"|66.18
|align="right"|-11.26
|-

|-
|}

|-
 
|Liberal
|Paul Earl
|align="right"|28,175
|align="right"|77.44
|align="right"|+12.61
|-

|-

|Social Democratic 
|Michael H. Willie
|align="right"|629	
|align="right"|1.73
|align="right"|-0.49
|-

|-
|}

|-
 
|Liberal
|Paul Earl
|align="right"|18,489
|align="right"|64.83
|align="right"|-11.30
|-

|-
 
|Independent
|John Edward Lyall
|align="right"|2,066
|align="right"|7.24
|align="right"|-
|-

|CCF 
|Ross Edward Worrall
|align="right"|634	
|align="right"|2.22
|align="right"|-
|-

|Independent Lib.
|Moses Miller
|align="right"|359	
|align="right"|1.26
|align="right"|-
|-
|}

|-
 
|Liberal
|Paul Earl
|align="right"|18,834
|align="right"|76.13
|align="right"|-2.00
|-

|-
 
|Union of Electors
|Roland Morin
|align="right"|309
|align="right"|1.25
|align="right"|-
|-
|}

 
|Liberal
|James Arthur Mathewson
|align="right"|20,140
|align="right"|78.13
|align="right"|+3.18

|CCF 
|James Wilson Thompson
|align="right"|2,431	
|align="right"|9.43
|align="right"|-
 
|Independent
|Ernest Carl Werry
|align="right"|1,437
|align="right"|5.57
|align="right"|-

|}

|-
 
|Liberal
|James Arthur Mathewson
|align="right"|6,827
|align="right"|74.95
|-

|Independent Cons.
|William Ross Bulloch
|align="right"|2,431	
|align="right"|9.43
|-

|-

|Independent Cons.
|Henry Michael Clark
|align="right"|179
|align="right"|1.97
|-

|ALN
|Gaétan Labrosse
|align="right"|111
|align="right"|1.22
|-
|}

References
 Election results (National Assembly)
 Election results (QuebecPolitique.com)

Former provincial electoral districts of Quebec